The Alliance for Democracy is a progressive opposition political party in Nigeria.  It was formed on 9 September 1998.  At the 2003 legislative elections, 12 April 2003, the party won 8.8% of the popular vote and 34 out of 360 seats in the Nigerian House of Representatives and 18 out of 109 seats in the Nigerian Senate.  The party was formed to promote the cause of the Yoruba people in the Nigerian federation following the annulment of the June 12, 1993 presidential election widely believed to have been won by Chief M. K. O. Abiola, a Yoruba multi-millionaire businessman.

In 2007 Chief Dr. Christopher Pere Ajuwa, of the Niger Delta region, ran but lost, the race for the seat of President of Nigeria.

The party was embroiled in a leadership tussle between Mojisola Akinfenwa and Adebisi Akande, which lingered until September 2006 when the 'Bisi Akande faction merged with other opposition parties to form the Action Congress party.

Aims and Objectives of the Alliance For Democracy (AD) 
The party plans to introduce the following:

 Free education;
 Free health care programme;
 Integrated rural development;
 Full employment

References

External links
Alliance for Democracy (on the Internet Archive)
Alliance for Democracy USA, overseas chapter in the United States
Party detail

Defunct political parties in Nigeria
1998 establishments in Nigeria